The German Wirehaired Pointer is a medium to large-sized griffon type breed of dog developed in the 19th century in Germany for versatile hunting.  It became a leading gun dog in Germany in the later part of the 20th century. It is the result of the careful mixing and crossing of the Wirehaired Pointing Griffon, German Shorthaired Pointer, German Roughhaired Pointer, and the hunting Pudelpointer in the late 19th century.

Description

Appearance

The German Wirehaired Pointer is a well muscled, medium to large-sized dog of distinctive appearance. Balanced in size and sturdily built, the breed's most distinguishing characteristics are its weather resistant, wire-like coat and its facial furnishings. Typically pointer in character and style, the German Wirehaired Pointer (GWP) is an intelligent, energetic and determined hunter. The tail is typically docked to two-fifths of the natural length. In countries where docking is prohibited the tail should be of sufficient length to reach down to the hocks. Like all German pointers, they have webbed feet. This dog can have a similar appearance and therefore is sometimes confused with the Spinone Italiano, Český Fousek, or Wirehaired Pointing Griffon.

Coat
The functional wiry coat is the breed's most distinctive feature. A dog must have a correct coat to be of correct type. The coat is weather resistant and water-repellent. The undercoat is dense enough in winter to insulate against the cold but is so thin in summer as to be almost invisible. The distinctive outer coat is straight, harsh, wiry and flat lying, and is from one to two inches in length. The outer coat is long enough to protect against the punishment of rough cover, but not so long as to hide the outline of the dog. On the lower legs the coat is shorter and between the toes it is of softer texture. On the skull the coat is naturally short and close fitting. Over the shoulders and around the tail it is very dense and heavy. The tail is nicely coated, particularly on the underside, but devoid of feather. Eyebrows are of strong, straight hair. Beard and whiskers are medium length. The hairs in the liver patches of a liver and white dog may be shorter than the white hairs. A short smooth coat, a soft woolly coat, or an excessively long coat is to be severely penalized when showing. While maintaining a harsh, wiry texture, the puppy coat may be shorter than that of an adult coat. The coat of the puppy should be shorter than 1 inch the adult coat should be kept at 1 inch long.

Gait
The dog should be evaluated at a moderate gait. The breed standard is that the movement is free and smooth with good reach in the forequarters and good driving power in the hindquarters. The topline should remain firm.

Temperament

The German Wirehaired Pointer (GWP) is affectionate, lively, very determined, active and intelligent. Eager to learn and loyal to its family, it needs a handler who is consistent in approach. They like to be occupied, are vigorous and enjoy working for their owners. They are friendly with those they know, but are sometimes aloof with strangers and should be socialized at an early age. They often don't do well in a kennel environment. German Wirehaired Pointers are happiest and most well behaved when they are part of the family and can spend time with their people. They can be rather willful. Some dogs have a tendency to roam. Powerful and energetic, they can become bored and hard to manage without enough exercise. The German Wirehaired Pointer is a good all-around gun dog, able to hunt any sort of game on any sort of terrain. This dog has a good nose and can track, point, and retrieve on both land and water. Loyal and playful, the GWP thrives on human companionship. However, they are still dogs, and all dogs may bite small children without adequate management and supervision. Although they are generally accepting of other dogs, they tend to focus upon the people in their family.

Color
The Colors are: Liver (brown) and white or black and white ticked usually with some solid patches, and solid liver (brown) with or without a white chest patch.

History

The German Wirehaired Pointer traces its origins back to 1880. The breed originated in Germany, where Baron Sigismund von Zedlitz und Neukirch was a leading breeder, wanting to create a versatile hunting dog that would work closely with either one person or a small party of persons hunting on foot in varied terrain; from the mountainous regions of the Alps, to dense forests, to more open areas with farms and small towns. The breed the Germans desired had to have a coat that would protect the dogs when working in heavy cover or in cold water, yet be easy to maintain. Careful crosses of the German pointer with many other breeds. Sources differ on the exact lineage, though the Wirehaired Pointing Griffon, Pudelpointer, Stichelhaar, and Deutscher-Kurzhaar are commonly accepted as the most likely contributors. This is a dog that can fully respond to the needs of its hunter. The goal was to develop a wire-coated, medium-sized dog that could:
Search for, locate and point upland game
Work both feather and fur with equal skill and retrieve water fowl
Be a close-working, easily trained gun dog
Be able to track and locate wounded game
Be fearless when hunting "sharp" game such as fox
Be a devoted companion and pet; and
Be a watchdog for its owner's family and property.

All "drahts" must meet rigorous hunt and physical evaluations before being eligible for breeding. In addition to searching and pointing, these tests include the tracking and recovery of all game including wounded game such as fox, rabbit, deer and boar, which may not be required of a dog that hunts birds predominantly.

For upland (i.e. non-waterfowl) bird work, many GWPs have distinguished themselves with all-breed Field Championships and Master Hunter titles. When purchasing a working GWP,  attention needs to be paid to identifying breeders that place emphasis on all aspects of the versatile hunting dog. Among these breeders can be found accomplished dogs including Dual Championships (both field and show).

See also

 Dogs portal
 List of dog breeds
 German Shorthaired Pointer
 German Longhaired Pointer
 Český Fousek (Bohemian wirehaired pointing griffon)

References

Further reading

External links

 
 

Dog breeds originating in Germany
FCI breeds
Gundogs
Pointers